Several ships of the Spanish Navy have borne the name Hercules:
Hercules (1716), a 50-gun ship, stricken in 1718. 
Hercules (1719), a 60-gun ship, broken up in 1746.
Hercules (1756), a 70-gun ship, removed from Navy lists in 1759.
Hercules (1819), a 20-gun ship.

Spanish Navy ship names